The Bank of England Act 1946 (c 27) is an Act of Parliament of the United Kingdom which came into force on 14 February 1946. The Act brought all of the stock of the Bank of England into public ownership on the "appointed date" (1 March 1946). This was one of a series of nationalisations by the post-war Labour government led by Clement Attlee.

See also

 Bank of England Act 1716
 Bank of England Act 1998

References

External links
 Bank of England Legislation, the Charters of the Bank and related documents

United Kingdom Acts of Parliament 1946
Bank of England
1946 in economics
Nationalisation in the United Kingdom
Banking legislation in the United Kingdom